Jared Solomon may refer to:

 Jared Solomon (baseball)
 Jared Solomon (Maryland politician)
 Jared Solomon (Pennsylvania politician)